Leo Gestel (11 November 1881, Woerden – 26 November 1941, Hilversum) was a Dutch painter. His father Willem Gestel was also an artist. Leo Gestel experimented with cubism, expressionism, futurism and postimpressionism. Along with Piet Mondrian and Jan Sluyters he was among the leading artists of Dutch modernism.

Life 

Gestel was first instructed in art by his father, Willem Gestel, the director of an art school, and his uncle, Dimmen Gestel, who had painted with Vincent van Gogh. Due to financial problems Gestel created advertisements (e.g. for Philips) for illustrated books.

While in Paris he came in contact with the avant-garde movement. In 1913 Herwarth Walden offered him the chance to exhibit work in the "Erster Deutscher Herbstsalon" in Berlin. Generally Gestel spent the summer in Bergen, where he joined the Bergen School. In 1929 the majority of his works were lost when a fire destroyed his studio; he then moved to Blaricum.

Public collections 
 Stedelijk Museum Alkmaar, Alkmaar
 Drents Museum, Assen
 Museum De Hallen, Haarlem
 Frans Hals Museum, Haarlem
 Singer Laren, Laren
 Kröller-Müller museum, Otterlo
 Museum van Bommel van Dam, Venlo
 Museum de Fundatie in Zwolle

References 
 Trappeniers, Maureen S. "Gestel, Leo." In Grove Art Online. Oxford Art Online, (accessed February 3, 2012; subscription required).
Leo gestel in the RKD

External links 

 Entry for Leo Gestel on the Union List of Artist Names
 More information on artfacts.net.
 Leo Gestel on ArtCyclopedia

1881 births
1941 deaths
Dutch painters
Dutch male painters
Cubist artists
Modern painters
Expressionist painters
Post-impressionist painters
People from Woerden